Agnee is the eponymous debut album by Pune-based fusion rock band Agnee. The album was released on April 27, 2007. It has two tracks 'Sadho Re' & 'Kabira' featuring the poems of Saint Kabir Das. 'The MTV Roadies Theme' track features the show host Raghu Ram.

All the songs (except tracks 1 & 2) were recorded & mixed by Nitin Joshi at Sound Ideaz, Pune and mastered by Ty deGroff at The Final Sound, Albuquerque. Tracks 1 & 2 were recorded by Kunal and mixed & mastered by Tyrone Fernandes at Yatra, Mumbai.

The album sleeve mentions Sandeep Chowta as special contributor for the songs 'Sadho Re' and 'Kabira'.

Track listing
All music composed by Koko, Mohan & Arijit.

Personnel
 Kaustubh Dhavale (Koko) — Guitars, backing vocals
 Kannan Mohan  (Mohan) — Vocals, percussions, guitars
 Arijit Datta — Vocals, bass

References

2007 debut albums